Little Nicky is a 2000 comedy film starring Adam Sandler.

Little Nicky may also refer to:
 Little Nicky (video game), a 2000 video game based on the film
 Little Nicky (cat), a cat believed to be the first successful feline cloning for commercial reasons
 Little Nikki (born 1996), British singer-songwriter
 Nicodemo Scarfo (1929–2017), known as "Little Nicky" the head of the Philadelphia crime family

See also
 Nicky Little (born 1976), Fijian rugby union player
 Le Petit Nicolas, a series of French children's books first published in 1959
 Le Petit Nicolas (TV series), a 2009 French animated TV series based on the books
 Little Nicholas, a 2009 French-Belgian family comedy film based on the books